The 1946–47 Australians defeated the touring England team 3–0 in the 1946–47 Ashes series. First-class cricket had continued in Australia until January 1942 and as grade cricket had continued throughout the war there had been less of an hiatus than in England. Their cricket grounds had not been bombed and compared to austerity Britain, Australia was a land of plenty, which allowed for a more rapid recovery than in the old country, as had happened after the First World War. There was no Sheffield Shield in 1945–46, but the Australian Services XI had played all the states and there had been non-Shield interstate games. However, Australia's main advantage was the encouragement of their younger players, in particular by Bradman. Though overshadowed by the great 1948 Australian team, in 1975 Don Bradman reckoned that it was Australia's strongest post-war home team, with the 1974–75 Australians coming a close second and the 1950–51 Australians third. It was also superior to the pre-war Australian teams, as though they were just as strong in batting they had no fast bowlers and depended heavily on the leg-spin of Clarrie Grimmett and Bill O'Reilly. In 1946–47 Ray Lindwall and Keith Miller emerged as a great new-ball partnership, with quality support from Ernie Toshack, Ian Johnson and Colin McCool. The only area for improvement was in finding another top-order strokemaker, which was soon resolved by the arrival of Neil Harvey.

The captain

Batsman
He was not the most exciting and entertaining of batsmen, but was untouchable when it came to efficiency and all-round batting strength. He had self-confidence that was quite chilling and there was not a bowler he did not feel he could master. There was something of a "Little Dictator" about him at the wicket, and an indication of his legendary run-making skill is that it was considered a failure whenever he missed out on a century.
Tom Graveney
Donald George Bradman, better known as Don Bradman or The Don, was the greatest batsman of all time, ranked first in ESPN's Legends of Cricket and can be statistically regarded as the greatest sportsman of all, as "no other athlete dominates an international sport to the extent that Bradman does cricket". His unorthodox grip meant he could not cream the ball through the covers like Wally Hammond and purists contend that Jack Hobbs was better on a sticky wicket, but on any pitch that did not make batting a lottery he simply made more runs. He made them fast too, until the 1990s his 3.7 runs per six ball over in Tests was the fastest scoring rate of any batsmen except Gilbert Jessop (4.2). Even if his pre-war career was ignored his feats would make him the greatest batsman of all time; 680 runs (97.14) against England in 1946–47, 715 runs (178.75) against India in 1947–48 and 508 runs (72.57) in England in 1948, with 8 hundreds in his last 15 Tests. Ironically he was bowled by an Eric Hollies googly for a duck in his final Test innings when he was 4 runs short of a batting average of 100.00, he had to settle for 99.94.

Health
Don Bradman went into a huddle and refused to make any statement concerning his cricket future; it was not until this sagacious colossus had obtained first-hand reports from Perth, and had sampled the bowling at Adelaide and Melbourne then he told the Board of Control he would be available for the opening Test...Bradman is justifiably proud of his marvellous record, and one suggestion is that only consented to play because of his supreme confidence of being able to gather in his full share of runs, and that his health would stand up to any strain imposed on it.
Clif Cary
Bradman volunteered for the RAAF in 1940, but transferred to the Australian Army as a lieutenant in the Army School of Physical Training. Stress and depression aggravated his fibrositis and he was invalided out of the army in 1941, after which he spent months in poor physical condition and lost the use of his right thumb and forefinger. He resumed stockbroking in 1942 and set up his own firm after his employer was imprisoned for fraud and embezzlement. In 1945 he joined the South Australian Cricket Association and became their representative with the Board of Control and he seriously considered retiring from cricket in order to concentrate on an administrative role. He played a few games in 1945–46, but Richard Whittington thought he was "the ghost of a once great cricketer". The press and public badly wanted to see him play and after a few warm up matches Bradman agreed to captain Australia against the advice of his doctor. In the First Test he played poorly for 28 when he chopped a ball to Jack Ikin in gully. The England players (and Keith Miller from the dressing room) thought he was out, but Bradman was confident that the ball had been jammed into the ground by his bat before it flew up to Ikin and refused to walk. The umpire gave him the benefit of the doubt, but Wally Hammond told Bradman "That's a fine way to start a Test series." Bradman went on to make a match-winning 187 and it was thought if Bradman had been given out he would have retired from cricket.

Australian captain
To Bradman, even in the first series after so many years of war and suffering, there was apparently no room for carefree cricket in an Anglo-Australian Test. He knew of only one way in which to play this game...In the 1946–47 Tests he was in charge of the stronger side, and for that reason seemed to overshadow Hammond, although he went on the field with an outlook that was vastly different to the Englishman. He appeared as determined in seeking convincing victory as if he had been opposed by a team of Jardines and Larwoods
Clif Cary
In Don Bradman's time as an Australian batsman before the war England won 13 Ashes Tests to Australia's 10, some of them by huge margins. He made his debut in the First Test of 1928–29, making 18 and 1 as Australia were beaten by a record 675 runs. In their last Test before the war England had made 903/7 – Wally Hammond waiting the Don was unfit to bat before he declared – and Australia lost by an innings and 579 runs, another record. Bradman was not the man to forget such things and now he had the better team he was determined to repay the favour. The First Test of 1946–47 saw Australia win their largest victory over England by an innings and 332 runs, the first time that a Test team had lost and won successive Tests by an innings, albeit with a ten-year gap due to the war. As a captain Bradman had few rivals, tough, shrewd and rarely missing a trick. He liked to play aggressive cricket, racking up huge scores with his batting then bowling the opposition out. While fielding Bradman carefully watched batsmen play, and if he saw a weakness he would call over the bowlers to tell them and reset his field accordingly. In the First Test at Brisbane he even took Ernie Toshack down the pitch, showed him exactly where he wanted him to bowl and make him bowl a practice over alongside the pitch before play, after which the left-armer took 9 of the 15 English wickets to fall that day. He was often criticised for being distant and removed from his team and too conscious of his superiority, "a star with ten extras". However, he built the 1946–47 team from scratch, gave them encouragement, and made them Bradman-minded; "When you get in front, nail 'em into the ground. When you get 'em down, never let up." By 1948 he had moulded them into one of the great teams in cricket history, nicknamed The Invincables [sic] as they won the 1948 Ashes series 4–0 and were undefeated on tour. He retired at the end of the 1948–49 season and is the only Australian to be knighted for his services to cricket.

Unbeaten run
With typical resilience, Australian youth participated in the restoration of sport to pre-war grade, directly khaki and the blue uniforms were laid aside. every effort had been made by administrators to preserve the framework of competition during the years of strife, and in addition to the services games, club matches in all cities were played every Saturday...We are, perhaps, on the threshold of another Golden Age – but, as, yet, only on the threshold.
Clif Cary
After the Second World War Australia began a record unbeaten run of games; 14 Tests against England, 26 Tests against all countries and 96 games in all cricket, having lost their last game to England at the Oval in 1938. Their record remained until England played 27 Tests without defeat in 1968–71. 
1–0 (1 Test)  in New Zealand 1945–46
3–0 (5 Tests) vs England 1946–47.
4–0 (5 Tests) vs India in 1947–48
4–0 (5 Tests) in England in 1948.
4–0 (5 Tests) in South Africa in 1949–50
4–1 (5 Tests) vs England in 1950–51, England winning the Fifth Test at Melbourne by 8 wickets.

Batting

Opening batsmen
It was common knowledge that Arthur Morris, after failing in the first two Tests, was in grave danger of being dropped, and Meuleman was his obvious successor. In the first innings Arthur made 21 and we all thought Ken's chances were sky high. Arthur scored 155 in the second innings and saved his place. Meuleman, twelfth man in the first two Tests...was instantly dropped. And he has never been asked to play since. If ever a man was thrown on the scrap heap it was Ken.
Keith Miller

Australia had three great openers in this period, Bill Brown, Sid Barnes and Arthur Morris. Brown had been an Australian batsman for most of the 1930s, coming in at number three after Bill Woodfull and Bill Ponsford or opening with Jack Fingleton. He captained Australia on their tour of New Zealand in 1945–46, which unlike other such tours had one of its matches belatedly recognised as a Test. Brown missed the 1946–47 series through injury so Barnes was promoted to open with Morris and soon established themselves as Australia's opening pair. When Brown recovered too he returned to batting at number three. Barnes played one Test before the war – at the Oval in 1938 – so hardly rates as a pre-war player even though he made his first class debut in 1936. He was a back-foot strokeplayer known for his off-side cuts and drives before the war, but so improved his on-side play that Alec Bedser changed his bowling grip so as to avoid bowling in-swingers at his legs. It is as an eccentric that he is best remembered, playing in Don Bradman's testimonial match using a miniature bat, serving drinks in a state match wearing a lounge suit instead of whites and leaping over the turnstiles at the MCG. In the Second Test in 1946–47 he threw away his wicket when he reached 234 so that he would make the same score as his captain. He was dropped from the Australian team because of his antics, and unsuccessfully took the case to court. Barnes made 846 runs (70.50) against England in the 1940s and his opening partner Arthur Morris 1,199 (79.93), but Morris' Test average suffered after facing the powerful England attacks of the 1950s. A stylish left-hander who uniquely made 148 and 111 on his first class debut in 1940–41 Morris had excellent footwork which made him a good player against spin, but was vulnerable to in-swinging balls aimed at his leg-stump. As a result, he was labelled "Bedser's Bunny" in 1950–51 until he made 206 in the Fourth Test. In 1946–47 he made three centuries in a row, 155 in the Third Test at Melbourne and 122 and 124 not out in the Fourth at Adelaide. Only Bradman made more than his 503 runs and in 1948 he made the most runs (696) and topped the averages (87.00), but as E.W. Swanton wrote "what the figures do not say is that few more charming men have played for Australia, and I cannot name one who was more popular with his opponents". Merv Harvey was a middle order strokeplayer who was called up to open with Morris when Sid Barnes was unfit to play in the Fourth Test. He made 12 and 31 and never played for Australia again, though his younger brother Neil became a famous Test batsman.

Top order batsmen

After Don Bradman in the batting order was his vice-captain Lindsay Hassett, a dimulative (5'6") batsman who had been a great strokemaker before the war and had made his Test debut in England in 1938. He captained the scratch Australian Services cricket team which drew the Victory Tests 2–2 against England in 1945. After the war he took his batting more seriously and was more defensive, though never dull, and he never failed in a series. He had an impish good humour, but this stopped when he walked onto the field and "there is no better team man in Australia". Keith Miller had been a young batsman before the war better known for playing Australian rules football in his native Victoria. In the war he was a Flight Lieutenant in the RAAF, and injured his back crash-landing a de Havilland Mosquito, which affected the rest of his playing career. He was the star of the Victory Tests, having decided that "The people of England wanted an escape from the hellish suffering they had experienced for so many years. Those who turned up to watch cricket deserved something better than grim, unentertaining stonewalling, and I was determined to go for runs every time I went in to bat". He hit a swashbuckling 185 in 165 minutes for the Dominion XI vs England at Lords with seven towering sixes and became a cricketing star. Miller kept to this philosophy throughout his career, becoming one of the world's most entertaining strokemakers and a magnet for the crowds. Although an all-rounder Miller saw himself as a batsman first and batted in the top order throughout his career, though it suffered as he was often spent from bowling. Ron Hamence was the nearly man of the Australian team, he made his Test debut after his career best 145 vs the MCC and was stranded on 30 not out in their first innings collapse to Doug Wright. He played India in 1947–48 and toured England in 1948, but played only two more Tests as he could not force his way into the strong Australian team.

Middle order batsmen
One of the great strengths of the team was its plentiful all-rounders, apart from Keith Miller, there was Ray Lindwall, Colin McCool, Ian Johnson and the wicketkeeper Don Tallon. Lindwall took to fast bowling after seeing Harold Larwood as a boy, but was a strong striker of the ball and a menace to parked cars in grade cricket. In the Third Test he hit exactly 100 off 90 balls with 14 fours and a six and added 154 in an hour and a half with Tallon, whose 92 off 108 balls with 10 fours was the highest score by an Australian wicketkeeper until Rod Marsh made 132 against New Zealand in 1973–74. Like Tallon Ian Johnson never quite batted as well as expected, but topped the averages in the 1954-55 Ashes series by making 116 runs (58.00). McCool made 95 in the First Test and 104 not out in the Third, when he came in at 188/5 and dominated the strike. He was a good player of spin with wristy cuts and vigorous hooks.

Bowling
Strange as it may seem when the veteran leg-spinner Bill O'Reilly announced his retirement at the beginning of the season there were fears that Australia's untried bowlers would suffer against the much-vaulted England batting line up of Len Hutton, Cyril Washbrook, Bill Edrich, Denis Compton and Wally Hammond. The opposite became true as the English batsmen initially failed and Australia won the First and Second Tests by an innings.

Pace bowlers
Keith Miller and Ray Lindwall handsomely exemplified the axiom that great fast bowlers win matches. For a decade they were a magnificent bowling combination for Australia, and in the immediate post-war years they were devastating ... Lindwall and Miller took thirty-five wickets in that 1946/7 series and at last Australia had a winning combination. The havoc wrought by Larwood and company a decade earlier still rankled; the nation wanted genuine fast bowlers to repay the humiliation.
Bob Willis and Patrick Murphy

At the forefront of the bowling attack was Ray Lindwall, who became a fast bowler after watching Harold Larwood in 1932-33. His whose smooth run up and perfect delivery produced swing and control and bouncers at a lethal pace, though he dropped the ball short less than Miller. Neville Cardus later wrote that "He has so many brains it's a wonder why he ever went in for fast bowling" and working hand-in-glove with his captain Don Bradman he would think batsman out and catch them in carefully selected field-placings. A. P. Herbert was moved to poetry to describe his bowling action and Trevor Bailey wrote "Watching him bowl was one of the most satisfying spectacles the game has ever produced". Even so, his arm was thought to be too low (Frank Tyson thought him almost a round-arm bowler) and his long drag could have produced numerous no balls, though he was rarely called for this. His partner Keith Miller had been a batsman, but in the Victory Tests the Australian Services XI were short of bowlers and Hassett used Miller initially as a change bowler and then gave him the new ball. To everyone's surprise he picked up wickets and soon his strength and natural talent made him into a genuine fast bowler. Bradman knew Australia needed this more than another batsman and encouraged Miller to develop his new talent, though his back injury limited him to short spells. Unlike his new-ball partner Miller liked to drop the ball short and lacked consistency, sometimes bowling leg-breaks or off-spin. Bill O'Reilly wrote "The value of Miller's bowling lies wholly and solely in its surprise element. Just when he appears to be well under the control of the batsman he comes to light with a ball that can upset anyone". Together they formed the best fast bowling duo in post-war cricket, perhaps the greatest of any era, and were the spearhead of Australia's success. Ernie Toshack was a left-arm medium pace bowler who bowled with a packed leg-side field and tied up the batsmen when Lindwall and Miller were resting. In the First Test he had the perfect pace to unhinge the English batting on a Brisbane sticky, but failed to understand Bradman's instructions. In the end Bradman took him to the middle, pointed to the spot where he wanted Toshack to bowl, and made him practice alongside the wicket until he understood what was required. Once this was done 9 of the last 15 wickets fell to his bowling and Australia won by an innings. Fred Freer was a steady fast-medium swing bowler who liked to drop the ball short and replaced Ray Lindwall in the Second Test when the fast bowler had chickenpox.

Spin bowlers
The game was all but decided in an evil hour Hutton, Compton and Hammond himself – the flower of England's batting – went one by one to the high, slow, teasing spin of Colin McCool and Ian Johnson, each giving the ball more and more air as though trying to discover whether there was any parabola they could not describe without impelling the forward step that would have allowed the ball to be met on the full-pitch or the half-volley.
E.W. Swanton
The England captain Wally Hammond ordered his batsmen to stay within their crease when facing the Australian spinners, whose figures were flattered as a result. In the Second Test Ian Johnson took 6/42 off 241 balls with his off-spin, including one spell of 1/3 off 88 balls, of which 85 were not scored from. Johnson's off spin was a rarity in Australia, where the pitches work better to leg-spin, and was not a big spinner of the ball, but he used flight to deceive the batsmen and could tie down one end. Colin McCool was "a better fieldsman than a batsman, and a better batsman than he was a bowler" But before the MCC team had even landed in Australia he snapped up 35 wickets (28.82) with his flighty leg-spin for Queensland with help from Don Tallon behind the stumps. He dismissed Hammond, Hutton, Washbrook, Compton, Yardley, Edrich and Voce in his 7/106 for an Australian XI against the MCC, 5/109 in the Third Test and 5/44 in the Fifth and "the English batsmen seemed like rabbits fascinated in the presence of a snake". Bruce Dooland was another leg-spinner who was brought into the South Australia side after one club match in 1945. He was not overawed and soon earned a place on the tour of New Zealand. He was not as deadly as McCool and by the end of the tour he suffered as the England batsman became used to his flighted leg-breaks. George Tribe was a rare specialist slow left-arm wrist-spin bowler who took more first class wickets than any other Australian bowler in 1945–46 and 1946–47. He suffered from uneven form, taking 6/49 for Victoria vs the MCC, but costly in the Tests.

Fielding

Hawk-eyed, swift in action after sure reception, Tallon goes for everything...many of his deeds he has accomplished have been remarkable for sheer speed of thought and execution and his only fault in his early matches was impetuous appealing.
Clif Cary
Don Tallon first appeared as a wicket-keeper in 1933 and was a shock exclusion for the Ashes tour in 1938. In 1939 he equalled Ted Pooley's record by dismissing 12 batsman in a first class match and another when he held 7 catches in another match. He was 30 when he made his Test debut and proved to be an excellent keeper, but in his eagerness would move in front of the slips, denying them the full view of the ball. Tallon was also "one of the most notorious appealers of all time" and "was often roaring before he had studied facts and it was his over-eagerness that brought about the shocking decision which so greatly affected Washbrook". Tallon had scooped up a ball from the ground which the batsmen and other observers thought touched the ground, but having made the appeal Bradman backed Tallon and Washbrook was given out. However he improved on his performances and  Bill O'Reilly wrote "I have never seen a better keeper than Tallon as he was in England in 1948. Otherwise Australia had a fine fielding team which was younger and quicker than their English opponents. Bradman himself has been a good mid-fielder, but was probably restricted by fibrositis and was unable to field in the Second Test due to a pulled leg muscle. Keith Miller "was a captain's dream, because he is alert, sure and fast in no matter what position he is placed". Ian Johnson and Colin McCool were noted slip fielders and Sid Barnes was a good catcher close to the wicket at short-leg.

Australian team

First Test – Brisbane

See Main Article – 1946–47 Ashes series

Second Test – Sydney

See Main Article – 1946–47 Ashes series

Third Test – Melbourne

See Main Article – 1946–47 Ashes series

Fourth Test – Adelaide

See Main Article – 1946–47 Ashes series

Fifth Test – Sydney

See Main Article – 1946–47 Ashes series

References

Sources
 Clif Cary, Cricket Controversy, Test matches in Australia 1946–47, T. Werner Laurie Ltd, 1948
 Ray Lindwall, Flying Stumps, Marlin Books, 1954
 Keith Miller, Cricket Crossfire, Oldbourne Press, 1956
 A.G. Moyes, A Century of Cricketers, Angus and Robertson, 1950
 E.W. Swanton, Swanton in Australia with MCC 1946–1975, Fontana/Collins, 1975
 Bob Willis and Patrick Murphy, Starting with Grace, A Pictorial Celebration of Cricket 1864–1986, Stanley Paul, 1986
References using Cricinfo or Wisden may require free registration for access.

Further reading
 John Arlott, John Arlott's 100 Greatest Batsmen, MacDonald Queen Anne Press, 1986
 Peter Arnold, The Illustrated Encyclopedia of World Cricket, W. H. Smith, 1985
 Ashley Brown, The Pictorial History of Cricket, Bison, 1988
 Bill Frindall, The Wisden Book of Test Cricket 1877–1978, Wisden, 1979
 Tom Graveney and Norman Miller, The Ten Greatest Test Teams  Sidgewick and Jackson, 1988
 Chris Harte, A History of Australian Cricket, Andre Deutsch, 1993
 Alan Hill, The Bedsers: Twinning Triumphs, Mainstream Publishing, 2002
 Ray Robinson, On Top Down Under, Cassell, 1975
 E.W. Swanton (ed), Barclay's World of Cricket, Willow, 1986

External links
 CricketArchive tour itinerary

1946 in Australian cricket
1947 in Australian cricket
Australian cricket seasons from 1945–46 to 1969–70